The Athletic Club Rigas Feraios Velestinou  (Greek Ρήγας Φεραίος Βελεστίνου) is α sport club in the Greek village of Velestino, Thessaly. The club was made and named in tribute of the Thessalian Greeks own Greek War of Independence founder, Rigas Feraios as he was born and raised in Velestino.

Football
Rigas Feraios was created in 1926 as an amateur club in Velestino. 
Through the club have passed hundreds of young people of Velestino offering their skills and writing to the club's history. The club was created in 1926 and in 1928 established the football club "Riga Fereou".

History 
During the years 1955-1958 "Rigas Feraios F.C." plays in the local category C, where he pioneered and in 1959 "Rigas" declared local champion in the C category. In 1961 "Rigas" being champ in local category B rises to A local class.
Season 1973-1974 was the most fruitful for the club because it was in the Second National Division, which is the landmark in the history of "Rigas Feraios F.C.". 1994–1995, being a local champion in the A category promoted for the first time in Delta Ethniki. In 2000-2001 finish in 5th place in the Delta Ethniki where it remains until the year 2007.
In 2010 the team relegated in the first local of EPS Thessaly and decides to reorganize.

Notable Friendlies

The team have played twice against AEK Athens, the Greek Football giants. They may have lost twice, however they played decently in both games. 

Football clubs in Thessaly
1926 establishments in Greece
Association football clubs established in 1926
Gamma Ethniki clubs